Garabed "Chuck" Haytaian (born January 28, 1938) is an American Republican Party politician, who was the Speaker of the New Jersey State Assembly during the 'tax revolt' of the James Florio – Christine Todd Whitman era.  He is of Armenian descent.

Political career 
He served in the General Assembly from 1982 to 1996. In 1994, he staged an unsuccessful bid for a seat in the United States Senate, falling to incumbent Frank Lautenberg, 50%-47%. Haytaian was the Chairman of the New Jersey Republican State Committee from 1995 to 2001.

Personal life 
Haytaian, born in the Bronx, has been a resident of Independence Township, New Jersey.

Sexual Harassment Accusation 
In 1996, Beth Herbert, administrative assistant at the State House brought sexual harassment charges against Haytaian.  She claimed that over a fifteen-month period, Haytaian would periodically call her into his office and molest her.  The worst incidents, according to Herbert, took place after his failed Senate bid in 1994.  Haytaian in turn filed charges against Herbert for defamation.

The State offered paid Herbert $175,000 in a settlement to avoid what they believed would be a more costly legal battle.

See also
List of American politicians of Armenian descent

References 

|-

|-

|-

|-

1938 births
American people of Armenian descent
Chairmen of the New Jersey Republican State Committee
Ethnic Armenian politicians
Living people
People from the Bronx
People from Independence Township, New Jersey
Speakers of the New Jersey General Assembly
Republican Party members of the New Jersey General Assembly